The second conference of the 2022–23 PBA 3x3 season started on November 5 and ended on December 17, 2022. It consisted of six two-day legs and a grand final. TNT Tropang Giga became the conference's Grand Champion after defeating Cavitex Braves in the Grand Finals, 19–17.

Teams
The players listed have played in at least one of the legs.

1st leg

Groupings

Preliminary round

Pool A

Pool B

Pool C

Pool D

Classification 9th–12th

Knockout stage
TNT Tropang Giga defeated Platinum Karaoke in the finals, 17–15, to become the first leg winners.

Bracket

Quarterfinals

Semifinals

Third place game

Finals

Final standings

2nd leg

Groupings

Preliminary round

Pool A

Pool B

Pool C

Pool D

Classification 9th–12th

Knockout stage
J&T Express defeated TNT Tropang Giga in the finals, 21–19, to become the second leg winners.

Bracket

Quarterfinals

Semifinals

Third place game

Finals

Final standings

3rd leg

Groupings

Preliminary round

Pool A

Pool B

Pool C

Pool D

Classification 9th–12th

Knockout stage
TNT Tropang Giga defeated Cavitex Braves in the finals, 21–17, to become the third leg winners.

Bracket

Quarterfinals

Semifinals

Third place game

Finals

Final standings

4th leg

Groupings

Preliminary round

Pool A

Pool B

Pool C

Pool D

Classification 9th–12th

Knockout stage
Platinum Karaoke defeated Cavitex Braves in the finals, 13–12, to become the fourth leg winners.

Bracket

Quarterfinals

Semifinals

Third place game

Finals

Final standings

5th leg

Groupings

Preliminary round

Pool A

Pool B

Pool C

Pool D

Classification 9th–12th

Knockout stage
Cavitex Braves defeated Platinum Karaoke in the finals, 21–13, to become the fifth leg winners.

Bracket

Quarterfinals

Semifinals

Third place game

Finals

Final standings

6th leg

Groupings

Preliminary round

Pool A

Pool B

Pool C

Pool D

Classification 9th–12th

Knockout stage
Cavitex Braves defeated TNT Tropang Giga in the finals, 21–20, to become the sixth leg winners.

Bracket

Quarterfinals

Semifinals

Third place game

Finals

Final standings

Legs summary

Grand Finals

Preliminary round

Pool A

Pool B

Knockout stage

Bracket
Seed refers to the position of the team after six legs. Letter and number inside parentheses denotes the pool letter and pool position of the team, respectively, after the preliminary round of the Grand Finals.

Quarterfinals

Semifinals

Third place game

Finals

References

3x3 2nd
Pba 2nd conference